Leon Curtis Shelly (1906–1987) was a Canadian producer of industrial and sponsored films, active in Vancouver (1936–45) and in Toronto (1945–56).

He was the son of W. C. Shelly, a onetime Member of the BC Legislative Assembly (1928–33) and provincial finance minister. The elder Shelly was also co-founder of Shelly Brothers Ltd., a successful commercial bakery in Vancouver. In the early 1930s, Leon Shelly was involved in managing and developing the Grouse Mountain Resort in North Vancouver, another of his father's business ventures. 

In 1936, Shelly assumed control of two existing motion picture service companies in Vancouver. Motion Skreenadz Limited had been founded in 1920, and was initially operated by J. Howard Boothe and Harry Rosenbaum. Skreenadz specialized in the production of theatrical advertising trailers or "screen ads," but later expanded to make promotional shorts and travelogues for the local market. Vancouver Motion Pictures Limited, founded in 1928 by Roger Bourne and Charles Lambly, initially provided film laboratory and technical services. The companies both had offices in the film exchange building at 1216 Burrard (at Davie) in downtown Vancouver.

With the help of cinematographer and technical wizard E. Wallace (Wally) Hamilton, Shelly updated the facilities and equipment necessary for film production, including optical sound recording, an essential component for commercial motion pictures. By the late 1930s, Shelly was producing quality industrial and sponsored films for the BC market, eventually combining the operations of the two companies under the name Vancouver Motion Pictures.

Vancouver Motion Pictures 
Under Shelly's leadership, Vancouver Motion Pictures emerged in the 1930s and 1940s as an active and busy production house, creating dozens of sponsored promotional and industrial shorts. The company and its staff would play an important early part in the development of the Vancouver film industry. Notable clients included the BC Government Travel Bureau, BC Packers, Kelly Douglas Limited, and the Powell River Company.

Shelly's operation brought professional colour film production to Vancouver, adopting the Cinecolor bi-pack (two-negative) colour process. On three bigger-budget 35 mm films produced for the Travel Bureau in 1940–42, intended for theatrical distribution to US audiences, he hired experienced  crew members from Hollywood, including cinematographer Ray Fernstrom, narrator Gayne Whitman, and editor Ed Taylor.

The regular staff working at Vancouver Motion Pictures included many people who would play important roles in the development of the Canadian film and television industry. They included directors Oscar C. Burritt, Lew M. Parry, and Ed Taylor; cinematographers Oscar C. Burritt, Wally Hamilton, Ernie Kirkpatrick, Don Lytle, and Mel Parry; editors Maureen Balfe and Hellen Semmens; and titling artist/art director/animator Marguerite Roozeboom (née Goulding).

In 1942–43, VMP began filming BC sequences for the National Film Board of Canada, which used the material in films for its propaganda series Canada Carries On and World In Action. In spring 1943, a film industry trade journal reported that the company "working full blast these days in commercial and government work." By 1946, Shelly had made half a dozen complete documentaries for the NFB. The war years at Vancouver Motion Pictures proved critical in the emergence of filmmaking on Canada's west coast.

Shelly Films (Toronto) 

At the end of the Second World War, Shelly renamed Vancouver Motion Pictures as "Shelly Films" and moved the operation to Toronto, Ontario. Much of the VMP staff went east  to work there. However, Lew Parry stayed in Vancouver and started his own production company, eventually becoming BC's most prolific filmmaker. Marguerite Roozeboom was art director and animator on many of Parry's films, and eventually founded Pageant Productions with her husband, cinematographer Bill Roozeboom.

Based in Toronto, Shelly was able to expand his clientele base to include interprovincial and national companies. One of his productions, Beans of Bounty (1948), was co-winner in the Non-Theatrical category at the 1st Canadian Film Awards presentation in 1949.

Shelly Films discontinued film production in 1956 to focus on laboratory work and the release printing of Hollywood feature films.

Select filmography

Motion Skreenadz Ltd. 

Why? (Pacific Milk advertising trailer, ca. 1937) – Rare extant example of a Motion Skreenadz trailer with sound track
The Story of Canadian Salmon (Motion Skreenadz Ltd., ca. 1939, for BC Packers Ltd.)

Vancouver Motion Pictures Ltd. (pre-Shelly era) 

Old Hastings Mill Store Moved [attributed to VMP] (1930)
Dominion Day crowds witness world champion sprinters in action at Hastings Park (1930)
Grand Opening of Vernon's Civic Airport, Vernon, BC (1931)
Governor General his excellency the Right Honourable the Earl of Bessborough, PC, GCMG, and her excellency the Countess of Bessborough visit Britannia Mines on Commodore E. W. Hamber's steam yacht "Vencedor" of the RVYC (1932)

Vancouver Motion Pictures Ltd. (Shelly era) 
Behind the Headlines (for the Vancouver Daily Province, 1938-39)
Beautiful British Columbia (for the BC Government Travel Bureau, 1940) – [Lost]
Coffee for Canadians (for Nabob Foods/Kelly Douglas Limited, 1940)
British Columbia Sports [aka Evergreen Playland] (for the BC Government Travel Bureau, 1941)
North of the Border (for the BC Government Travel Bureau, 1942)
Apple Valley (for BC Tree Fruits Ltd., 1942)
Coffeeland to Canada (for Nabob Foods/Kelly Douglas Ltd.)
Banshees Over Canada (for the National Film Board, 1943) – British Columbia sequences only
Road to Tokyo (for the National Film Board, 1943) – British Columbia sequences only
Tomorrow's Timber (for the National Film Board/Dept. of Mines and Resources, Canada, 1944)
River of Paper (for the Powell River Company, 1944)
Salmon for Food (for BC Packers, ca. 1945)
The Herring Hunters (for BC Packers, ca. 1945)
Limbs to Order ( (for the National Film Board, 1945)
Road to Recovery`(for the National Film Board, 1945)
Of Japanese Descent`(for the National Film Board, 1945)

Shelly Films 

Salmon Run (for the National Film Board, 1945)
Valiant Company (for General Motors of Canada, 1945)
Land of Sky Blue Waters (for BC Tree Fruits Ltd., 1946)
Jasper (for the National Film Board, 1946)
Niagara the Powerful (for the Hydro Electric Power Commission of Ontario, 1946)
Motoring in the Maritimes (for Imperial Oil [?], 1947)
Search Unending : The History of Oil Operations in Canada (for Imperial Oil, 1947)
Royal Winter Fair (for the Imperial Tobacco Company of Canada Limited, 1948)
Something to Chew On (for the National Film Board/Dept. of National Health and Welfare, 1948)
Beans of Bounty (for Victory Mills, 1948)
Oil for Canada (for Imperial Oil, 1949)
Farm Forestry (for Department of Lands and Forests Ontario, 195-)
Vacation in Quebec (for Imperial Oil, 195-)
Shop Talk (for Robert Simpson Co., ca. 1952)
The Wealth of the Nation (for Abitibi Power and Paper Company, 1952)
A Good Place to Live (for Thompson Products, 1955–56)

References 

1906 births
1987 deaths
Film producers from British Columbia
Canadian documentary film producers